Carlos Palanca Sr., also known as Tan Guin Lay, was a Chinese Filipino businessman and philanthropist.

Early life
Palanca was born as Tan Guin Lay in 1869 in Amoy, Qing China (now Xiamen).

Career
Tan Guin Lay migrated to the Philippines in 1884. Tan adopted the name Carlos Palanca, after his godfather of the same name whose Chinese name was Tan Quien-sien. The name "Carlos Palanca" adopted by both men came from a Spanish colonel. He worked as an apprentice in a hardware store ran by a relative before setting up his own store in 1890, and became involved in textile trading.

He established the La Tondeña Incorporada in Tondo, Manila a distillery which grew to be a major player in the Philippine alcoholic beverage industry.

Death
Palanca died on September 2, 1950. He was 81 years old.

Legacy
Palanca was one of the most prominent Chinese Filipino businessman during the American colonial era in the Philippines.

In 1987, the heirs of Palanca entered La Tondeña in a joint venture with San Miguel Corporation (SMC). La Tondeña was eventually absorbed by the SMC, and was renamed as Ginebra San Miguel in 2003. Palanca's heirs were able to establish the Don Carlos Palanca Memorial Awards for Literature in his honor.

His former residence built in 1940 along Taft Avenue in Pasay is a protected heritage site.

References

Filipino people of Chinese descent
20th-century Filipino businesspeople
Businesspeople in brewing
1884 births
1950 deaths
People from Xiamen
Chinese businesspeople